The 2013 Copa Sudamericana Finals were the final two-legged tie that decided the winner of the 2013 Copa Sudamericana, the 12th edition of the Copa Sudamericana, South America's secondary international club football tournament organized by CONMEBOL.

The finals were contested in two-legged home-and-away format between Brazilian team Ponte Preta and Argentine team Lanús. The first leg was hosted by Ponte Preta at Estádio do Pacaembu in São Paulo on 4 December 2013, while the second leg was hosted by Lanús at Estadio Ciudad de Lanús in Lanús on 11 December. The winner qualified for the 2014 Copa Libertadores, and earned the right to play against the 2013 Copa Libertadores winners in the 2014 Recopa Sudamericana, and against the 2013 J. League Cup winners in the 2014 Suruga Bank Championship.

After the first leg ended in a 1–1 draw, Lanús won the second leg 2–0, to claim their first Copa Sudamericana title.

Qualified teams

Road to the finals

Note: In all scores below, the score of the home team is given first.

Format
The finals were played on a home-and-away two-legged basis, with the higher-seeded team hosting the second leg. If tied on aggregate, the away goals rule was not used, and 30 minutes of extra time was played. If still tied after extra time, the penalty shoot-out was used to determine the winner.

Match details

First leg

Second leg

See also
2014 Recopa Sudamericana
2014 Suruga Bank Championship

References

External links
 
Copa Sudamericana, CONMEBOL.com 

Finals
Copa Sudamericana Finals
Copa Sudamericana Finals 2013
Copa Sudamericana Finals 2013
2013 in Brazilian football